Lomas Estrella is a station on Line 12 of the Mexico City Metro. The station is located between San Andrés Tomatlán and Calle 11. It was opened on 30 October 2012 as a part of the first stretch of Line 12 between Mixcoac and Tláhuac.

The station is located southeast of the city center, at the intersection between Avenida Tláhuac and Paseo Galias. It is built above the ground.

Ridership

References

External links 
 

Mexico City Metro Line 12 stations
Railway stations opened in 2012
2012 establishments in Mexico
Mexico City Metro stations in Iztapalapa
Accessible Mexico City Metro stations